The fourth edition of the Women's Islamic Games took place in Tehran and Rasht, Iran in September 2005. A total of 45 countries, 200 teams, and 1316 athletes competed at the Games, which featured fifteen separate sports. The competition was overseen by 516 referees, from twelve countries, and 15 international observers. The 2005 event saw many countries competing for the first time, including the United States and numerous East Asian, European and African countries. Iran won the competition with a total of 102 medals.

Participants

 
 
 
 
 
 
 
 
 
 
 
 
 
 
 
 
 
 
 
 
 
 
 
 
 
 
 
 
 
 
 
 
 
 
 
 
 
 
 
 
 
 
  (Great Britain)

Sports
The sports competed at the 2005 Women's Islamic Games were: athletics, badminton, basketball, fencing, futsal, golf, gymnastics, handball, judo, karate, squash, swimming, table tennis, taekwondo, tennis, and volleyball.

Futsal Results

2005 teams (5): Iran / Turkmenistan / Iraq (national team) + England & Armenia (Muslim team and not official national team)
Iran 43-0 England Muslim / Iran 3-0 Armenia Muslim / Iran 26-1 Iraq / Iran 32-1 Turkmenistan

Day 1 : 1 Mehr 1384
Iraq 14-1 England Muslim
Turkmenistan 0-27 Armenia Muslim

Day 2: 2 Mehr 1384
Iran 32-1 Turkmenistan
England Muslim 3-38 Armenia Muslim

Day 3: 3 Mehr 1384
Iraq 0-14 Armenia Muslim
Iran 43-0 England Muslim

Day 4: 4 Mehr 1384
Turkmenistan 6-1 England Muslim
Iran 26-1 Iraq

Day 5: 5 Mehr 1384
Turkmenistan - Iraq
Iran 3-0 Armenia Muslim

Final Ranking : 1- Iran 2- Armenia Muslim 3- Iraq 4- Turkmenistan 5- England Muslim 

Source:
1
2
3
4
5
6 
7
8
9

Medal table

Women's Islamic Games, 2005
Women's Islamic Games
Wom
Multi-sport events in Iran
International sports competitions hosted by Iran
Sport in Tehran
Women's Islamic Games
21st century in Tehran
2005 in women's sport